Dabing Street is Czech comedy TV series. The plot is set in the summer of 2001 and describes what happens in a fictional dubbing company Studio ZERO after its owner dies. His widow takes over company and tries to share the management of the studio with the employees.

The series is based on the play of the same name by Dejvické Theatre, which won the title of Best Comedy of 2013 at the XIV. of the Grand Festival of Laughter in Pardubice. The actors of the Dejvické Theatre are therefore cast in most roles. Several well-known actors were cast in "civilian" roles playing themselves (e.g. cameo of Filip Švarek, Jiří Bartoška, Viktor Preiss). The dubbed foreign language scenes are not from actual films, but were filmed specifically for the series. It was a TV series debut for director Petr Zelenka.

Cast
Klára Melíšková as Eva Archová, studio co-owner, unsuccessful actress
Hynek Čermák as Karel Bartoš, oldest technician and loyal employee
Václav Neužil as Pavel Vlas, technician, Eva's lover
Tereza Voříšková as Lada Bartošová, cleaning lady and Karel's sister
Marek Adamczyk as David, youngest technician

External links
Website (in Czech)
IMDb.com

References 

Czech comedy television series
2018 Czech television series debuts
Czech Television original programming
Czech Lion Awards winners (television series)